The 1954–55 British Home Championship was a football tournament played between the British Home Nations during the 1954–55 football season. It was won by a strong England side which included players such as Johnny Haynes and Nat Lofthouse as well as future manager Don Revie. England and Scotland, had competed at the 1954 FIFA World Cup in the summer before the tournament began and both teams had struggled, eventually being knocked out by Uruguay, Scotland by a 7–0 margin.

England began the tournament as favourites and proved their status with a simple victory over Ireland in their first match. Scotland matched this with a difficult win over Wales in their match, although only by one goal to nil. Both Wales and Ireland improved in their second matches, the Irish holding Scotland to a 2–2 draw whilst the Welsh almost achieved the same against England in London, eventually losing 3–2. The final games were played at the conclusion of the domestic season, and saw Ireland fall to the Welsh under their inspirational goalscorer John Charles, who netted a hat trick in a 3–2 victory. England had by this time taken the championship with a comprehensive demolition of Scotland 7–2 in their final match, Dennis Wilshaw claiming four of the goals.

Table

Results

References

1951
1954–55 in Northern Ireland association football
1954–55 in English football
1954–55 in Scottish football
1954–55 in Welsh football
1954 in British sport
1955 in British sport